Sébastien Pilote (born 1973 in Saint-Ambroise, Quebec) is a Canadian film director and screenwriter. He was a Canadian Screen Award nominee for Best Director and Best Original Screenplay at the 2nd Canadian Screen Awards for his 2013 film The Dismantling (Le Démantèlement).

He previously directed the short film Dust Bowl Ha! Ha! in 2007, and the feature film The Salesman in 2011, and has worked for Télé-Québec.

In 2014 he was the patron and curator of the Festival Vues dans la tête de... film festival in Rivière-du-Loup.

Filmography

References

External links

1973 births
Film directors from Quebec
Canadian screenwriters in French
Writers from Quebec
People from Saguenay–Lac-Saint-Jean
Living people